Ida Herion (1876–1959) was a female German dance teacher, who from 1912 ran a dance school in Stuttgart named "Schule für Musik und Körperkultur".

In the 1920s Herion's students were the subject of two books with photographical illustrations.  

Herion's dance school has been regarded as providing a distinctively modernist view of nudity and the body:

References

1876 births
1959 deaths
German female dancers
Dance teachers
Modern dance